Andrew Wheatley is a Jamaican politician from the Labour Party. He is a Deputy General Secretary of the JLP. He resigned as minister after a scandal.

Offices 

 Minister of Science Technology and Mining which he held from 2016 to July 2018
 Mayor of Spanish Town (2005–12)
 Deputy Mayor of Spanish Town and Vice-chair of the Council (2003–05)

References 

Living people
21st-century Jamaican politicians
Government ministers of Jamaica
Members of the House of Representatives of Jamaica
Jamaica Labour Party politicians
People from Saint Catherine Parish
People from Spanish Town
University of the West Indies alumni
Year of birth missing (living people)
Members of the 12th Parliament of Jamaica
Members of the 13th Parliament of Jamaica
Members of the 14th Parliament of Jamaica